Phtheochroa cartwrightana is a species of moth of the family Tortricidae. It is found in North America, where it has been recorded from Manitoba, Maine and Ohio.

References

Moths described in 1907
Phtheochroa